Lars-Erik Lövdén (born 1950) is a Swedish politician, former government minister and former member of the Riksdag, the national legislature. A member of the Social Democratic Party, he represented Malmö Municipality between January 1980 and October 2004. He was also a substitute member of the Riksdag twice: between October 1979 and November 1979 (for Grethe Lundblad); and between November 1979 and December 1979 (for Eric Holmqvist).

Lövdén was born in Malmö. He is the son of Sten Lövdén and Inga Lövdén (née Roslind). He has a Bachelor of Laws degree from Lund University (1975).

Lövdén was Minister for Housing and Local Government between November 1998 and October 2004 and Minister of the Interior between November 1998 and December 1998. He was Governor of Halland County between January 2005 and January 2014. He is currently president of MKB Fastighets AB, the local municipal housing company in Malmö.

References

1950 births
Governors of Halland County
Interior ministers of Sweden
Living people
Lund University alumni
Members of the Riksdag 1979–1982
Members of the Riksdag 1982–1985
Members of the Riksdag 1985–1988
Members of the Riksdag 1988–1991
Members of the Riksdag 1991–1994
Members of the Riksdag 1994–1998
Members of the Riksdag 1998–2002
Members of the Riksdag 2002–2006
Members of the Riksdag from the Social Democrats
Politicians from Malmö
Swedish Ministers for Housing